Juan Pedro Yllanes Suárez (born 12 January 1960) is a Spanish former judge and current politician. He presided over cases in his native Andalusia and in the Balearic Islands. A member of Podemos, he served in the Congress of Deputies from 2016 to 2019, and as the Vice President of the Balearic Islands since 2019.

Legal career
Born in Seville, Andalusia, Yllanes graduated in Law from the University of Seville, and became a magistrate in 1991.

In January 2004, Yllanes made international headlines by sentencing Mohamed Kamal Mustafa, imam of the Fuengirola Mosque, to 15 months in prison for inciting violence against women through a book encouraging physical violence towards wives. The cleric had cited freedom of religion and precedent in Islamic law in his defence. The ruling was the first verdict of its kind in Spain.

Yllanes later moved to the courts of the Balearic Islands. In October 2009, he sentenced Javier Rodrigo de Santos, the deputy leader of the People's Party in Palma de Mallorca, to 13 years and 6 months in prison for child sexual abuse. Santos, a Catholic conservative, had abused boys during church activities.

In June 2015, Yllanes was appointed to judge Infanta Cristina of Spain – daughter of Juan Carlos I and sister of Felipe VI – her husband Iñaki Urdangarin and several others in the Nóos case. He left the case and the judicial profession in November, so he could lead Podemos's list in the Balearics in the 2015 Spanish general election.

Political career
Yllanes was re-elected in 2016. In October 2017, he was the only Podemos deputy to not stand and display a message in support of Jordi Sànchez and Jordi Cuixart, two jailed organisers of the 2017 Catalan independence referendum. Earlier in the year, he was the only Podemos deputy to not sign an initiative supporting the perpetators of the Altsasu incident in which two off-duty Civil Guards and their girlfriends were beaten in Navarre. During the dispute in Podemos between Pablo Iglesias and Íñigo Errejón, Yllanes backed the latter, but years later ruled out joining his new Más País party.

In November 2018 Yllanes was chosen as the lead candidate for the 2019 Balearic regional election. He received 1,344 of the 1,525 votes. His party fell from ten to six seats, but entered government through a pact with winners Socialist Party of the Balearic Islands (PSIB) and Més per Mallorca, resulting in him becoming vice president.

References

1960 births
Living people
Lawyers from Seville
Politicians from Andalusia
University of Seville alumni
20th-century Spanish judges
Podemos (Spanish political party) politicians
Members of the 11th Congress of Deputies (Spain)
Members of the 12th Congress of Deputies (Spain)
Members of the Parliament of the Balearic Islands
21st-century Spanish judges